Sinezona mouchezi is a species of minute sea snail, a marine gastropod mollusk or micromollusk in the family Scissurellidae, the little slit snails.

Description
The height of the shell attains 2 mm.

Distribution
This marine species occurs off St Paul Island, Southern Indian Ocean

References

 Vélain, C., 1877. Observations générales sur la faune des deux îles suivies d'une description des mollusques. Archives de Zoologie Expérimentale et Générale 6: 1-144, part. Zoologie

External links
 To Encyclopedia of Life
 To World Register of Marine Species

Scissurellidae
Gastropods described in 1877